Cholius is a genus of moths of the family Crambidae.

Species
Cholius leucopeplalis (Hampson, 1900)
Cholius luteolaris (Scopoli, 1772)

References

Scopariinae
Crambidae genera
Taxa named by Achille Guenée